East Calgary was an electoral district in the Northwest Territories from 1894 - 1905, which was created when Calgary was split into East and West Calgary.

The two ridings would later be merged to form the new Calgary Alberta provincial electoral district, when Alberta became a province separate from the Northwest Territories.

Election results 1894 - 1902

Note:
Northwest Territories is non-partisan except from after the 4th General Election in 1898 to 1905.

See also
Calgary-East Alberta provincial electoral district
Calgary East Federal electoral district
East Calgary Federal electoral district

References

Former electoral districts of Northwest Territories
Politics of Calgary